Crepuscule may refer to:
 Twilight
 Twilight (Wiesel novel), a novel by Elie Wiesel
 Le Crépuscule des temps anciens (The Twilight of the Bygone Days), a novel by Nazi Boni
 Crepuscule with Nellie, a jazz ballad Thelonious Monk dedicated to his wife
 Les Disques du Crépuscule, a Belgian record label